Eurypogon californicus is a species of soft-bodied plant beetle in the family Artematopodidae. It is found in North America.

References

Further reading

 

Elateroidea
Articles created by Qbugbot
Beetles described in 1880